Lufthansa Cargo AG is a German cargo airline and a wholly owned subsidiary of Lufthansa. It operates worldwide air freight and logistics services and is headquartered at Frankfurt Airport, the main hub of Lufthansa. Besides operating dedicated cargo planes, the company also has access to cargo capacities of 350 passenger aircraft of the Lufthansa Group.

History
Lufthansa operated a cargo subsidiary, called German Cargo, between 1977 and 1993 (earlier still, cargo operations were executed in-house,  under the Lufthansa Cargo name), when – in an effort to restructure the company – the cargo division was re-integrated into its parent, and split up into two parts (one for scheduled operations using Lufthansa-owned aircraft, and one for freight and logistics services using chartered or leased aircraft).

Lufthansa Cargo was created as a limited stock company on 30 November 2004, along with Lufthansa Cargo Charter. Lufthansa Cargo uses LH (the same IATA code as Lufthansa), as well as GEC (the former ICAO code of German Cargo) as airline codes.

Operations and subsidiaries

As of 2011, all Lufthansa Cargo aircraft are based at Frankfurt Airport, the seventh busiest freight hub in the world, where the airline enjoys a strong co-operation with Fraport, the operator of the airport. Cargo facilities at the airport are divided into two places (Cargo City North and South), of which the first one is nearly exclusively used by Lufthansa Cargo.

In earlier years, Lufthansa Cargo had a secondary base at Leipzig/Halle Airport, the European hub for DHL Express, from where it operated flights on behalf of DHL. Activities at this airport gradually came to an end following the formation of AeroLogic as a joint venture between Lufthansa and DHL, which henceforth caters for the DHL flights, allowing Lufthansa Cargo to concentrate on other services.

In 1996, Hinduja Cargo Services was founded as a joint venture between Hinduja Group and Lufthansa Cargo. The company operated a fleet of Boeing 727 freighters, flying from airports in the Indian subcontinent to feed Lufthansa Cargo's hub at Sharjah airport. The airline suspended operations in 2000 in favour of direct services from Frankfurt using Lufthansa Cargo aircraft.

In 2000, Lufthansa Cargo was a founding member of the WOW Alliance, a global cargo airline alliance, but left in 2007 as it did not see any benefits for the future.

In 2002 the special logistics company time:matters was founded, which was sold in the meantime, but is now again a wholly owned subsidiary of Lufthansa Cargo.

Lufthansa Cargo used to operate a hub for intra-Asian flights at Astana International Airport in Kazakhstan, but was forced to relocate it to Yemelyanovo Airport in Russia in 2007, because otherwise the airline would have been banned from entering Russian airspace, in what was described as an act of economic blackmail by the Russian authorities.

In 2008, Jade Cargo International was founded as a joint venture between Shenzhen Airlines, Lufthansa Cargo, and the German Investment Corporation, a German governmental entity. Jade ended operations in 2011.

In May 2011, Lufthansa Cargo opened another hub at Rajiv Gandhi International Airport in Hyderabad, India, to transport temperature-sensitive goods, especially pharmaceuticals, between South East Asia and Europe (and onwards to the United States).

In 2019, heyworld GmbH was founded as a wholly owned subsidiary of Lufthansa Cargo with a focus on eCommerce logistics. The company and another Lufthansa subsidiary was planned to benefit from the Airbus A321F operations.

In September 2020, Lufthansa Cargo confirmed it was retiring its remaining McDonnell Douglas MD-11F during 2021 despite the grown freight demand in the wake of the COVID-19 pandemic. The last MD-11F flight took place on 17 October 2021.

Destinations

, Lufthansa Cargo serves 57 cities worldwide with its cargo aircraft.

Fleet

Current fleet
, the Lufthansa Cargo fleet consists of the following aircraft:

With the delivery of the first Boeing 777F, Lufthansa Cargo started to name their aircraft in a scheme referring to typical greetings of the countries they serve. The first 777F was named Good day, USA, while an MD-11F was named Buenos días México for example.

Fleet development
The initial fleet of Lufthansa Cargo had previously belonged to German Cargo, and was expanded by cargo-converted former Lufthansa mainline Boeing 747-200s. From 1998, the airline began to gradually phase out all other aircraft types in favour of a fleet entirely consisting of the McDonnell Douglas MD-11 (which Lufthansa received as freighter versions in 2001 after MD-11 production ended) version and its successor, the Boeing 777 freighter.
In March 2011, the order of five Boeing 777F was announced, the same aircraft type which had earlier been chosen for AeroLogic. Almost the entire Lufthansa Cargo fleet today is composed of purpose-built freighter aircraft.
Lufthansa Cargo had planned to retire its remaining MD-11s by December 2020, but the retirement was delayed due to the increased cargo demand caused by the COVID-19 pandemic

Former fleet
Over the years, the following aircraft types were operated:

Accidents and incidents
On 26 July 1979, a Boeing 707 freighter (registration D-ABUY) operating Flight 527 crashed into a hilly slope shortly after take-off, killing all 3 crew-members onboard. The cause of the accident was mainly attributed towards the lack of Brazilian Air Traffic control to pay necessary attention to aircraft in their airspace and warn aircraft of the impending collision with terrain.
 On 18 October 1983, a Boeing 747-200 freighter registered D-ABYU operating as Flight 683 overshot the runway during an aborted takeoff at Kai Tak Airport in Hong Kong having experienced a failure of the no. 2 engine. The aircraft was substantially damaged, but was repaired and returned to service.
On 7 July 1999, a Boeing 727-243 freighter leased from Hinduja Cargo Services operating as Lufthansa Cargo Flight 8533 from Nepal to India, crashed into a mountain after takeoff from Tribhuvan International Airport in Kathmandu, Nepal, killing all five people on board.
On 7 November 2004 at 16:35 local time, a Boeing 747-200 freighter, owned and operated by Air Atlanta Icelandic, overshot the runway upon take-off at Sharjah International Airport and was damaged beyond repair. The aircraft, registered TF-ARR, had been leased by Lufthansa Cargo to operate Flight 8457 to Frankfurt Airport. The pilots had decided to abort the take-off run even though the remaining runway length did not suffice to bring the aircraft to a halt because of a burst tyre and the ATC notification of an alleged fire (which turned out to be not true). The four people on board were not injured.
 On 27 July 2010 at 11:38 local time, Lufthansa Cargo Flight 8460, an MD-11 registered D-ALCQ, crashed upon landing at King Khalid International Airport, Riyadh, Saudi Arabia and was damaged beyond repair in the ensuing fire. The Pilot in command and the First Officer — the only two persons on board — were able to leave the aircraft by themselves.
On 24 November 2013, Lufthansa Cargo Flight 8258, an MD-11 registered D-ALCE, bounced during landing at Viracopos International Airport and initiated a go around. The aircraft landed with substantial damage. It was later repaired and returned to service.

References

External links

 Official website

Airlines of Germany
Cargo airlines of Germany
Airlines established in 1994
Lufthansa Group
Germany–Russia relations
1994 establishments in Germany